Boyar is a surname. Notable people with the name include:
Burt Boyar (1927–2018), American voice actor and theatre writer
Joan Boyar (born 1955), American-Danish computer scientist
Lombardo Boyar (born 1973), American television and voice actor
Monica Boyar (1920–2013), Dominican-American nightclub singer
Robert M. Boyar (1937–1978), American physician and endocrinologist
Sully Boyar (1923–2001), American film and television actor

See also
Boyer
Boyars (surname)